Ali Baba Khan (born Ali Ul Habib, 5 March 1993) is a Pakistani Pashtun Sufi singer in the Pashto music industry.

Early life and education 
He was born on 5 March 1993 in Peshawar, Khyber Pakhtunkhwa. Khan got his telecommunications engineering degree from the City University of Science and Information Technology in Peshawar.

Singing career 
Khan sings in the Pashto language started formally in 2013. He performed at an international Sufi concert in Afghanistan. He paid tribute to the Sufi poet Rahman Baba in his video entitled "Malang Abdur Rahman". He sold the gun for his first video. At the start, he was not allowed from his family to proceed with his music career, but later they accepted his efforts for Pashto music.

In the grand event at Baacha Khan Trust with the eve of Re-Singing Ghani Khan, Ali Baba Khan performed with live band and got praised from audience very much.

Ali Baba Khan was the first to sing a celebrated poem of Ghani Khan Za yaw mast shan lewantoob yam in the genre of Sufi rock. He also introduced his Pure Sufi Rock Band first time in KPK while performing live in Bacha Khan Markaz. Khan is the pioneer of Sufi rock genre in Pashto music. His bandmates are Ali Baba Khan, Jerry Micheal, Joel Micheal, Ostad Mohsin, Qazi Umar and Jalal Khan.

Popular songs

Discography

Albums 

Video-only releases
 Tassawar  (تصور) (2015) - The First Ever Sufi Rock Music Song written By Ghani Khan, Ali got his recognition from this song.
 Dozakhi (دوزخی) (2018)

Other music

References

External links 

 
 
 

Living people
Pakistani male singers
Pashto-language singers
Pashtun people
People from Peshawar
1993 births